NEXGO (also known as Shenzhen Xinguodu Technology Co., Ltd.) is a global manufacturer of high-tech payment terminals, PIN pads and point of sale hardware and software. Company is headquartered in Shenzhen (China) and focuses on research and development, production, sale, and leasing of financial point of sale (POS) machine-based electronic payment processing products. Its business includes electronic payment, biometric, intelligent hardware, credit business, audit business, blockchain, and big data services. NEXGO operates worldwide through a network of partners and has over 25 million point of sale terminals deployed in over 50 countries.

History
NEXGO was founded in Shenzhen, China in 2001. In the same year company succeeded in developing the 1st generation wireless POS in China. In 2002, the company was designated by the State Encryption Management Commission as one of the general electronic payment scrambler instrument suppliers.

In 2004 the company launched the first color screen POS product in China. In 2006 NEXGO was selected by China UnionPay as one of the four international EFTPOS suppliers. In 2008, the company was recognized as one of Shenzhen's first national-level high-tech enterprises.

In 2009 the company released the first big screen multi-media POS terminal in China. Cooperated with American railway passenger company, and become the first Chinese POS manufacturer to enter American market. In October 2010 the company was officially listed on the Growth Enterprise Market with stock No.: 300130. In 2014, NEXGO released G3, which is the first wireless POS that passed PCI 4.0 in the world Xinguodu's GMB algorithm security POS project was included in the national high-tech industrial development project.

In 2016 company released the N5 Smart POS. Same year NEXGO set a major milestone in company's development unveiling NEXGO's first wholly owned overseas subsidiary Nexgo do Brasil Participações Ltda. The company has subsequently set up subsidiaries in Dubai and the US.

In 2018 Global Accelerex, licensed payment service provider in Nigeria unveiled NEXTGO N5 Smart POS as the first single unit Android Point of sale terminal to be certified for payment acceptance in Nigeria.

See also
 Point of sale companies

References

External links
 Official website

Technology companies of China
Retail point of sale systems
Point of sale companies
Chinese companies established in 2001
Companies based in Shenzhen
Chinese brands